Pluteus is a large genus of fungi with over 300 species.  They are wood rotting saprobes with pink spore prints and gills that are free from the stem.

The Latin word Pluteus means shed or penthouse.

Characteristics of the genus 
Characteristics of the Pluteus genus are:
These fungi grow on wood or wood remains.
The spore powder is deep pink, soon giving a pink tint to the initially pale gills.
The gills are free from the stipe.
There is no volva or ring (exception: the rare recently reclassified North American species P. mammillatus, previously Chamaeota sphaerospora).<ref>[https://nickrentlab.siu.edu/NickrentPDFs/Minnis2006.pdf A. M. Minnis, W. J. Sundberg et al., Annulate Pluteus species, a study of the genus Chamaeota in the United States", MYCOTAXON Vol. 96 pp. 31-39, April-June 2006]</ref>
Microscopically, they often have abundant, distinctive cystidia.  The spores are smooth and roughly egg-shaped.Pluteus is separated from Volvariella due to the lack of a volva, and from Entoloma by growing on wood and by microscopic features (Entolomas have angular spores).

Naming
The name Pluteus was established in 1837 by the founding mycologist Elias Magnus Fries at a time when agaric mushrooms were first being assigned to different genera.

The Latin word "pluteus" has various meanings related to military protective structures and its signification here may be that of a shield (the shape of the cap).

Remarks on particular species

Some of these mushrooms are edible including P. petasatus and P. cervinus, though most people rate their taste and consistency as average at best.Pluteus cervinus is the best known species in Europe and North America.

Several species of this genus bruise blue and contain psilocybin including Pluteus brunneidiscus, Pluteus salicinus, Pluteus cyanopus, Pluteus glaucus, Pluteus nigroviridis, Pluteus phaeocyanopus and Pluteus villosus''.

See also
List of Pluteus species

References

Further reading
 M. Kuo "The Genus Pluteus"
  (on Fondazione Museo Civico di Rovereto)

 
Agaricales genera
Taxa named by Elias Magnus Fries